Liao Feng-teh (17 April 1951 – 10 May 2008) was a Taiwanese politician who held leadership positions in the Kuomintang. Liao was chosen to become the Interior Minister designate in 2008 under Republic of China President Ma Ying-jeou, following Ma's victory in the Taiwanese Presidential Election of 2008. However, Liao, Deputy Secretary-General of the Kuomintang, died of cardiopulmonary failure while hiking on May 10, 2008, before he could take office.

Early life 
Liao Feng-teh was a native of Tungshan Township, which is located in Yilan County, Taiwan in northeast Taiwan. He received his doctorate in history from National Chengchi University. Liao worked as a reporter for the China Daily News, a Chinese language daily newspaper, which is run by the KMT. He also worked as a novelist and playwright before entering politics within the KMT.

Political career 
Liao Feng-teh worked as the director of the office of the then vice president of the Republic of China Lien Chan from 1997 until 1999. He then served as a legislator in the Legislative Yuan from 1999 until 2005.

Laio had served as the director of the Kuomintang's Organizational Development Committee since 2004. He oversaw eight successful election campaigns for the KMT from 2004 until the Presidential election in 2008.

Following the 2008 election victory of Taiwanese President Ma Ying-jeou, was chosen as the country's new interior minister designate. He would have taken office with the new KMT controlled government on May 20, 2008.

Death 
Liao was found unconscious by hikers on a mountain path near his home in Muzha, near the intersection of Wannin Street and Jungong Road on the outskirts of Taipei, at 4:05 P.M. on May 10, 2008. He had suffered from massive cardiopulmonary failure. Liao was rushed to Wan Fang Hospital where doctors attempted to resuscitate for five hours. Officials from the incoming KMT government rushed to the hospital upon hearing the news, including President Ma Ying-jeou, Vice President Vincent Siew and KMT Chairman Wu Po-hsiung, Premier Liu Chao-shiuan and other members of the new cabinet. However, Liao Feng-teh was pronounced dead at 9:05 PM on May 10, 2008, at the age of 57.

References 

1951 births
2008 deaths
Kuomintang Members of the Legislative Yuan in Taiwan
Yilan County Members of the Legislative Yuan
20th-century Taiwanese historians
Taiwanese male novelists
Taiwanese journalists
Place of birth missing
Members of the 4th Legislative Yuan
Members of the 5th Legislative Yuan
20th-century novelists
20th-century male writers
20th-century journalists